This is a list of Danish television related events from 2012.

Events
21 January - Soluna Samay is selected to represent Denmark at the 2012 Eurovision Song Contest with her song "Should've Known Better". She is selected to be the fortieth Danish Eurovision entry during Dansk Melodi Grand Prix held at the Gigantium in Aalborg.
25 February - Kim Wagner wins the first season of Voice – Danmarks største stemme.
23 March - Ida Østergaard Madsen wins the fifth season of X Factor.
13 May - Amanda Heisel wins the fourth season of Big Brother.
9 November - TV host Joakim Ingversen and his partner Claudia Rex win the ninth season of Vild med dans.
24 November - Emilie Paevatalu wins the second season of Voice – Danmarks største stemme.

Debuts
January 30 - Big Brother (2001-2005, 2012-2014)

Television shows

1990s
Hvem vil være millionær? (1999–present)

2000s
Vild med dans (2005–present)
X Factor (2008–present)

2010s
Voice – Danmarks største stemme (2011–present)

Ending this year

Births

Deaths

See also
 2012 in Denmark